Joseph Akati Saaka (born November 17, 1950) is a Ghanaian politician and member of the National Democratic Congress. He was a member of the 5th and 6th Parliament of the 4th Republic of Ghana representing Bole Constituency.

Personal life and early career 
A member of the Gonja ethnic group, Mahama was born in Bole on November 17, 1950.

After obtaining his Master of Business Administration (Marketing) from the University of Miami, Florida, USA, 1986, he started his career as a marketing expert and was employed as a sales and marketing manager at Dupaul Wood Treatment Company Limited. Committee on Poverty Reduction Strategy, Health. He is a Muslim and married with seven children.

Political career 
Became a Member of Parliament for Bole Constituency in January 2009. He won 11,452 votes or 64.78% in 2008 for the Bole Bamboi constituency. He began his political career that year after being elected to represent his constituency in the 5th parliament. He succeeded John Dramani Mahama who ran alongside John Atta Mills for presidency that year and won.

References

Living people
1950 births
Ghanaian Muslims
National Democratic Congress (Ghana) politicians
People from Northern Region (Ghana)
University of Miami Business School alumni
Ghanaian expatriates in the United States
Ghanaian MPs 2005–2009
Ghanaian MPs 2009–2013
Ghanaian MPs 2013–2017
Ghanaian MPs 2017–2021